Engrish is a slang term for the inaccurate, nonsensical or ungrammatical use of the English language by native speakers of Japanese, as well as Chinese and other Asian languages. The word itself relates to Japanese speakers' tendency to struggle to pronounce the English  and  distinctly arising from the fact Japanese has only one liquid phoneme (usually romanized r), but its definition encompasses many more errors. Terms such as Japanglish, Japlish, Jinglish, or Janglish are more specific to Japanese Engrish. The related Japanese term wasei-eigo (和製英語）(lit. 'Japanese-made English') refers to pseudo-anglicisms that have entered into everyday Japanese.

The term Engrish first appears in the 1940s (suggestive of a mispronunciation of English) but it was not until the 1980s that it began to be used as a byname for defective Asian English. While the term may refer to spoken English, it often describes written English. In Japan, it is common to add English text to items for decorative and fashion purposes (see Cool). Such text is often added to create a cosmopolitan feeling rather than to be read by native English speakers, and so may often be meaningless or grammatically incorrect. Engrish can be found in many places, including signs, menus, and advertisements. The words are frequently humorous to speakers of English.

Japanese Engrish / Japanglish
Japanese and English have significantly different grammar: Japanese word order, the frequent omission of subjects in Japanese, the absence of articles, a near-complete absence of consonant clusters, and difficulties in distinguishing /l/ and /r/, or /θ/ and /s/ sounds, all contribute to substantial problems using Standard English effectively. Japanese people have tended to score comparatively poorly on international tests of English.

Further, English is frequently used in Japan (and elsewhere) for aesthetic rather than functional purposes; i.e., for Japanese consumption, not for English speakers per se, as a way of appearing "smart, sophisticated and modern", in much the same way as Japanese and similar writing scripts are used in Western fashion. Such decorative English is not meant to be read and understood by native English speakers, so emphasis is not put on coherence or correctness.

The Japanese language also makes extensive use of loanwords, especially from English in recent decades, and these words are transliterated into a Japanese form of pronunciation using the katakana syllabary. Japanese speakers may thus only be familiar with the Japanese pronunciation or Japanese meaning, rather than its original pronunciation or meaning. This is particularly the case when the source English word contains sounds or sound clusters which have no equivalent in katakana. For example, Casiopea jazz fusion band (est. 1976) has its name based on "Cassiopeia": neither the double s nor the three-vowel -eia would fit the katakana format. More recent example: Sega's Mega Drive is spelled in katakana メガドライブ, hence pronounced as Mega Doraibu; the console was renamed for the market of United States of America as Sega Genesis.

In popular culture
Engrish has been featured occasionally in South Park, an American animated TV show by Trey Parker and Matt Stone. One example is the song "Let's Fighting Love", used in the episode "Good Times with Weapons", which parodies the poorly translated opening theme sequences sometimes shown in anime. Parker and Stone's feature-length film Team America: World Police (2004) also features Engrish when the North Korean leader Kim Jong-il is depicted singing the song "I'm so Ronery".

Monty Python's Flying Circus featured a parody of the drama series Elizabeth R, where they portrayed the cast riding motor-scooters and speaking Engrish, thus changing the title to "Erizabeth L".

In the 1983 film A Christmas Story, the Parker family goes to a Chinese restaurant for their Christmas dinner, and are serenaded by the waitstaff with Engrish Christmas carols, such as "Deck the harrs wis boughs of horry, fa ra ra ra ra ra ra ra ra" and "Jingre berrs, jingre berrs, jingre arr the way, oh what fun it is to ride in one-horse open sreigh!"

The British fashion brand Superdry, which takes inspiration from Japanese clothing styles, has established a style of placing meaningless Japanese text such as 'Sunglasses company' and 'membership certificate' on clothing sold in Britain. The company explained to a Japanese television news programme that most translations were done using simple automatic translation programs such as Babelfish, without attempting to make the texts accurate.

Gallery

See also 	

 "All your base are belong to us", an internet meme originating from the opening to the European Mega Drive version from Zero Wing
 Broken English
 Chinglish
 English as She Is Spoke
 "It's dangerous to go alone! Take this!", another internet meme of similar background (from the 1986 video game The Legend of Zelda for the Nintendo Entertainment System (NES)).
 Japanese Pidgin English
 List of lishes
 Dunglish, equivalent between English and Dutch
 Franglais, equivalent between English and French
 Runglish, equivalent between English and Russian
 Spanglish, equivalent between English and Spanish
 Denglisch, equivalent between English and German
 Non-native pronunciations of English
 Perception of English /r/ and /l/ by Japanese speakers
 Portrayal of East Asians in American film and theater
 Wasei-eigo
 List of wasei-eigo

References

External links

 Engrish.com Examples of Engrish from Japan, China and elsewhere
 fahruz.org (2003–2007) Collection of Engrish and equivalents in French, German and Italian (archived on Wayback Machine March 3, 2016)
 Large Engrish photo collection on Weird Asia News
 EngrishCheck Instagram Photos of Engrish from Japan
 Translation Party Online tool demonstrating how phrases are lost in translation between English and Japanese

Japanese vocabulary
Japonic languages
Macaronic forms of English
Slang
Internet memes